Erika C. Scheimer (born March 28, 1960) is an American voice actress in cartoons of defunct animation studio Filmation. She is the daughter of Lou Scheimer, who was an integral member of Filmation and a voice actor in his own right.

She is best recognized for her work on the original He-Man and the Masters of the Universe cartoon, where she provided additional female voices and occasional voice-acting for young boys (such as Prince Adam's cousin). She is often mistaken for her mother Joanne "Jay" Wucher (1931–2009) as the second voice for Queen Marlena, originally voiced by Linda Gary.

Scheimer also provided many voices for the spin-off series, She-Ra: Princess of Power, including Frosta, Queen Angella, Imp, Perfuma, Peekablue, Loo-Kee, and Flutterina. Additionally, she, along with her father Lou, provided voices for Bill Cosby's Fat Albert and the Cosby Kids.

In 2007, Scheimer publicly declared her homosexuality. In an interview with Terrance Griep, Scheimer explained that she felt comfortable as a lesbian working for Filmation: "I was a strong female voice myself, and—guess what?—I happened to be gay. Does that make any difference about anything? I'll tell you one thing, it didn't matter, because Filmation was one of the gayest places in town."

She has an older brother Lane (born 1956).

References

External links

1960 births
Living people
20th-century American actresses
American child actresses
American people of German-Jewish descent
Place of birth missing (living people)
American voice actresses
Jewish American actresses
American lesbian actresses
Filmation people